Arlington is an unincorporated community along the West Fork River in Harrison County, West Virginia, United States. It is located directly north of the city of Clarksburg.

References

Unincorporated communities in Harrison County, West Virginia
Unincorporated communities in West Virginia